is a former Japanese football player.

Club statistics

References

External links

j-league
Profile at Akita

1986 births
Living people
Hosei University alumni
Association football people from Ibaraki Prefecture
Japanese footballers
J2 League players
J3 League players
Japan Football League players
Kataller Toyama players
Blaublitz Akita players
Association football defenders